Kät may refer to:

 the stage name of the Swiss singer, Katharina Michel
 the shorthand name for the Ore Mountain festival called the Annaberger Kät